Vilkpėdė is an eldership in the Vilnius city municipality, Lithuania. It occupies 10,8 km². According to the 2011 census, it has a population of 21,346.

Gallery

References

Neighbourhoods of Vilnius